The Twilight Chronicles is the eighth studio album released by the melodic hard rock band Ten. The album marked a shift in the band's sound, relying more heavily on symphonic orchestrations and musical landscape, more so than ever before.

Track listing
All songs written by Gary Hughes.
 "The Prologue (The Elysian Fields)/Rome" – 12:19
 "The Chronicles" – 6:43
 "The Elysian Fields" – 6:49
 "Hallowed Ground" – 7:39
 "This Heart Goes On" – 4:24
 "Oblivion" – 7:03
 "The Twilight Masquerade" – 6:38
 "Tourniquet" – 6:49
 "Born to the Grave" – 5:00
 "When This Night Is Done/The Epilogue" – 7:36
The Asian version (Avalon Records MICP-10582) adds:
"Fahrenheit" – 5:54

Personnel
Gary Hughes – lead, backing vocals and programming
Chris Francis – lLead guitars and bass guitar
John Halliwell – rhythm guitars
Paul Hodson – keyboards and programming
Frank Basile – drums and percussion

Production
Executive producers – Chris Francis and John Halliwell
Mixing – Gary Hughes
Engineer – Gary Hughes, Chris Francis, Paul Hodson and Frank Basile
Additional engineering – Simon Brayshaw, Jason Hutton, Roger Smith and Annette Stelfox
Drums recorded by Frank Basile then "Gogged Up" by Chris Francis.

Concepts
"The Prologue (The Elysian Fields) / Rome" is about the legend of the foundation of Ancient Rome.
"The Chronicles" is based on The Chronicles of Narnia, a series of books by C.S Lewis.

References

External links
Heavy Harmonies page
Powermetal.dk review

Ten (band) albums
2006 albums
Albums produced by Gary Hughes
Frontiers Records albums